Blue Brook is a tributary of Green Brook in Union County, New Jersey, in the United States.

Blue Brook flows from Summit through Lake Surprise in the Watchung Reservation and terminating at Seeley's Pond near the corners of Diamond Hill Road and Valley Road where it joins Green Brook.

See also
List of rivers of New Jersey

References

Rivers of Union County, New Jersey
Rivers of New Jersey
Tributaries of the Raritan River
Watchung Mountains